The BC-342 was a World War II U.S. Army Signal Corps high frequency radio receiver. It was used primarily as part of field installations such as the SCR-188A, but could be used with mobile sets such as the 2 1/2 ton mounted SCR-399. First designed at Fort Monmouth, New Jersey by the U.S. Army Signal Corps, it was built by various manufacturers including RCA.  Many of the later units that are encountered today were manufactured by the Farnsworth Television and Radio Corporation of Fort Wayne, Indiana. Variants include the low frequency coverage BC-344 receiver, and the battery or dynamotor powered BC-312 receiver.

Specifications

The BC-342 could be operated from fixed and mobile positions. 
Power - An internal RA-20 AC rectifier power supply unit is fitted providing 250 volts DC and 12 volts AC for the receiver tube filaments (three pairs of the 6 volt tubes are wired in series and three in series / parallel).
Manual Reference: TM 11-850
Components: RA-20 Power Supply
Weight: 58 lbs.
Frequency Range: 1.5-18 MHz
Power Input: 110 VAC 60 Hz
Part of: SCR-197, SCR-237, SCR-277, SCR-299, SCR-399, MRC-1

10 vacuum tubes included: 
RF amplifiers - 6K7 (2) 
Mixer - 6L7 
Local oscillator - 6C5 
IF amplifiers - 6K7 (2)
CW oscillator (BFO) - 6C5
Detector/1st AF - 6R7 
Audio output - 6F6 
Rectifier - 5W4

The BC-342 was similar to the BC-348. Heavy chassis design was employed to minimize drift and oscillator instability due to temperature changes and vibration.

BC-312
The BC-312 was similar to the BC-342 but was designed to be directly powered by DC battery supply or dynamotor.

Power input: 12/24 volts DC power requirements. 6 volt tubes (Valves) connected in series with filament strings.
Frequency Range: 1.5 to 18 MHz
12A6 audio output tube in series with a resistor.
Dynamotor B+ supply.

BC-344
The BC-344 was similar to the BC-342 but was designed to cover low frequency bands.

Power input: 110 VAC 60 Hz
Frequency range: 150 KHz to 1.5 MHz

See also
ARC-5
Hammarlund super pro
National HRO
R-390A
Signal Corps Radio

References

External links
 
 Repairing a BC-342 
 BC-342 Data Sheet 

Military radio systems of the United States
World War II American electronics
Telecommunications equipment
Radiofrequency receivers